Vicki Cruse (December 13, 1967 – August 22, 2009) was an American aerobatic pilot and administrator. She won the U.S. national unlimited aerobatic title in 2007. She had been president of the International Aerobatic Club (IAC) since 2005 and was also an Experimental Aircraft Association (EAA) director and board member.

Cruse was a native of Springfield, Missouri and was shortlisted as one of the all-female slate of candidates in the Fossett LSR land speed record bid. At the time of her death she lived in Santa Paula, California.

Cruse died on August 22, 2009, when her light plane, a borrowed Zivko Edge 540, registration N540BW, crashed at the Silverstone Motor Race Circuit, Northamptonshire, England, during a qualifying flight for the World Aerobatic Championships. According to witnesses, having completed a vertical climb, she had pushed the nose over at the top in order to descend vertically. She then performed a one and one-quarter snap roll. The objective was to stop rotation after the aircraft has rolled one and one-quarter times, but rotation in this case only slowed, continuing to the ground.  She was pronounced dead at the scene.

The accident investigation concluded that the rudder pedal extensions could have contributed to a rudder control restriction but that pilot incapacitation was also considered a possible contributory factor.

References

External links
AOPA Online — Vicki Cruse dies during aerobatic competition
EAA and IAC Mourn the Loss of Vicki Cruse — Obit at the IAC Web site
The Vicki Cruse Memorial Scholarship

1967 births
2009 deaths
Aerobatic pilots
American women aviators
Aviators from Missouri
Aviators killed in aviation accidents or incidents in England
People from Springfield, Missouri
People from Santa Paula, California
20th-century American women
21st-century American women